Roland Kunsági (born 17 April 1990 in Budapest) is a Hungarian football player.

Honours
Ferencváros
Hungarian League Cup (1): 2012–13

References
 HLSZ profile
 

1990 births
Living people
Footballers from Budapest
Hungarian footballers
Association football goalkeepers
Budapest Honvéd FC II players
Rákospalotai EAC footballers
Ferencvárosi TC footballers
21st-century Hungarian people